Merry Christmas from Lawrence Welk and His Champagne Music is an album of Christmas music by Lawrence Welk and His Champagne Music. It was released in 1956 on the Coral label (catalog no. CRL-57093). The album debuted on Billboard magazine's popular albums chart on December 22, 1956, reached the No. 8 spot, and remained on that chart for three weeks

Track listing

Side 1
 "Let It Snow! Let It Snow! Let It Snow!" (Jule Styne, Sammy Cahn)
 "I Wanna Do More Than Whistle (Under The Mistletoe)" (vocals by Alice Lon, The Sparklers, written by Allan Copeland, George Cates, Mort Greene)
 "White Christmas" (vocals by The Sparkles, written by Irving Berlin)
 "Christmas Island" (vocals by The Sparkles, written by Lyle Moraine)
 "The Christmas Toy" (vocal by The Lennon Sisters, written by Mickey Miller, Priscilla Nemoy)
 "Santa Claus Is Comin' to Town" (written by Haven Gillespie, John Frederick Coots)

Side 2
 "Winter Wonderland" (vocals by Curt, Dick, Larry, written by Dick Smith, Felix Bernard)
 "Christmas Dreaming (A Little Early This Year)" (vocals by Dick Dale, written by Irving Gordon, Lester Lee)
 "Christmas Comes But Once a Year" (vocals by  Dean, Larry, The Sparklers, written by Stanley Clayton, Stephen Charles, Van Roberts)
 "Thanks for Christmas" (vocals by Alice Lon, The Sparkles, written by Mickey Codian, Richard Barr)
 "Twelve Gifts of Christmas" (vocals by Dean, Larry, The Sparkles, written by Buddy Kaye, Joanne Towne)
 "High on the House Top" (vocals by Larry Hooper, written by Bill Katz, Ruth Roberts, Stanley Clayton)

References

1956 albums
Coral Records albums
Lawrence Welk albums